Jacob Matthew Miller (born November 23, 1971) is a former right-handed Major League Baseball relief pitcher who played for the Colorado Rockies and Cleveland Indians. He was noted for his distinct sidearm delivery.

Independent and Minor League career
Miller began his professional baseball career playing for the Greenville Bluesmen in the independent Big South League (–) and Texas–Louisiana League. He signed with the Texas Rangers in December 1997, was released at the end of spring training in 1998 and then re-signed with the Rangers in June. He played in their minor league system for the Savannah Sand Gnats (1998), Charlotte Rangers, Tulsa Drillers (1999–) and Oklahoma RedHawks (2000).

Major League career
He appeared in only four games for Colorado that season and was again granted free agency in November.

The Cleveland Indians became Miller's fifth major league organization in five years when they signed him in February . He became an integral part of the Indians' bullpen, appearing in 57 games and posting a 4-1 record, 3.09 ERA, 55 strikeouts, 23 walks and one save. He continued his success in  before a strained elbow tendon in his throwing arm landed him on the disabled list in mid-July. He made two rehabilitation appearances in August, but was shut down for the season when the soreness in his elbow recurred. He appeared in 23 games for Cleveland in 2005 and was 1-0 with one save and a 1.82 ERA. But when his elbow symptoms returned during a game on April 19, he was again placed on the disabled list and the following week underwent surgery to repair the flexor tendon in the elbow. He returned in September and was effective in eight appearances. For the season, he was 1-0 with a 3.45 ERA in just 15 innings.

In , Miller began the season on the disabled list with a right forearm strain. When he returned May 9, he was optioned to Buffalo and made 14 appearances for the Bisons before he was recalled to Cleveland June 10, when Jeremy Sowers was sent down to Buffalo. He made only two appearances for the Indians and was returned to Buffalo to make room on the roster for Jason Stanford who was inserted into the starting rotation in place of the ineffective Sowers.

After the 2007 season, Miller signed with the Boston Red Sox, but did not appear in a game for their organization before being traded to the Pittsburgh Pirates. On July 29, Miller announced his retirement, after posting a 4-7 record with a 5.82 ERA for Triple-A Indianapolis.

References

External links
, or MLB.com, or The Baseball Cube, or Retrosheet, or Pura Pelota, or Baseball Reference (Independent, Minor & Winter leagues)

1971 births
Living people
Akron Aeros players
Baseball players from Mississippi
Buffalo Bisons (minor league) players
Charlotte Rangers players
Cleveland Indians players
Colorado Rockies players
Colorado Springs Sky Sox players
Delta State Statesmen baseball players
Greenville Bluesmen players
Gulf Coast Rangers players
Indianapolis Indians players
Lobos de Arecibo players
Louisiana–Monroe Warhawks baseball players
Mahoning Valley Scrappers players
Major League Baseball pitchers
Navegantes del Magallanes players
American expatriate baseball players in Venezuela
Oklahoma RedHawks players
People from Greenwood, Mississippi
Portland Beavers players
Sacramento River Cats players
Savannah Sand Gnats players
Tulsa Drillers players
University of Louisiana at Monroe alumni
Mississippi Delta Trojans baseball players